John Kaye (born 3 March 1940) is an English former footballer and manager.

Career
Kaye joined West Bromwich Albion from Scunthorpe United in May 1963 for £44,750, a club record for Albion at the time. He made his debut for the Baggies against Leicester City in August 1963. Kaye played for Albion between 1963 until 1971 during which time he won the FA Cup and the Football League Cup (also finishing runner-up in this competition twice) He scored for Albion in the second leg of their 1966 League Cup Final triumph over West Ham. Kaye left Albion in 1971 when he was sold to Hull City.

Kaye managed Hull City for a time period of September 1974 – October 1977. He had an overall win percentage of 31.2%.

Management statistics

Honours
West Bromwich Albion
FA Cup (1): 1967-68
Football League Cup (1): 1965-66, runner-up 1966–67, 1969–70

References

External links

1940 births
People from Goole
Footballers from the East Riding of Yorkshire
English footballers
English football managers
Goole Town F.C. players
Scunthorpe United F.C. players
West Bromwich Albion F.C. players
Hull City A.F.C. players
Hull City A.F.C. managers
Living people
English Football League players
English Football League representative players
Association football forwards
Association football central defenders
FA Cup Final players